Aconitum uncinatum, commonly known as wild monkshood or southern blue monkshood, is a species of flowering plant in the buttercup family, Ranunculaceae. It grows in moist to wet habitats along streams and in woods and clearings. It grows in the eastern United States in the Appalachian Mountains, on the Piedmont, and on the upper Atlantic Coastal Plain.

Toxicity and uses
The roots and seeds contain alkaloids, which are most poisonous before flowering. The plant has been used to make medicine to treat neuralgia and sciatica.

References

uncinatum
Flora of the Southeastern United States
Plants described in 1762
Taxa named by Carl Linnaeus
Flora without expected TNC conservation status